Germany Abolishes Itself: How We're Putting Our Country in Jeopardy (German title: Deutschland schafft sich ab: Wie wir unser Land aufs Spiel setzen) is a 2010 book by Thilo Sarrazin.

Themes
According to  John Judis, Sarrazin argued for restricting Muslim immigration to Germany on the grounds that Muslims who had immigrated to Germany from Turkey and other Muslim countries had failed to assimilate into German society, lived culturally separate lives in densely Muslim neighborhoods, and that two thirds of Germany's Muslim immigrants were on welfare.

Sarrazin argued that if immigration continued, Germany would, over time, become a predominantly Muslim country.

Publication
The book "shot to the top of the bestseller list;" It held the #1 spot on the German bestseller list for 21 weeks,  selling 1.5 million copies, and becoming "Germany's best selling political nonfiction book, by a German author, of the decade."

Reception
The book sparked heated debate. Turkish-born social scientist Necla Kelek argued that Sarrazin's ideas on education and immigration should be debated, without condemning him, and that the political class declines to engage with his arguments.

Journalist Simon Kuper has argued that, with over 1 million copies sold, Sarrazin had done more to publicize the concept of Eurabia more than anybody else in Europe.

References

2010 non-fiction books
Criticism of multiculturalism
Eurabia
German books
German nationalism
Anti-immigration politics in Germany
Non-fiction books about immigration to Europe
Anti-Islam sentiment in Germany